Lo-Reninge is a city and municipality located in the Belgian province of West Flanders. The municipality comprises the towns of Lo, Noordschote, Pollinkhove and Reninge. On January 1, 2006, Lo-Reninge had a total population of 3,306. The total area is 62.94 km² which gives a population density of 53 inhabitants per km². The Old Town Hall of Lo, built between 1565-1566, and its belfry were inscribed on the UNESCO World Heritage List in 1999 as part of the Belfries of Belgium and France site.

It is the birthplace of Flemish painter Jacques-Albert Senave.

References

External links

Official website - Information available in Dutch and limited information available in French, English and German

Municipalities of West Flanders